This is a list of lines and routes on the Hiroshima Electric Railway's railway and streetcar (tram) systems in and around Hiroshima, Japan.

Lines
Currently there are seven streetcar lines:

Except for the Miyajima Line, they are called the "Inner City Line" and the fare is the same across all lines.

Routes
There are eight regular streetcar routes running on the lines shown above. These routes are usually identified by numbers.

Ticketing system

Special tickets
Both two-day and one-day tickets are available.

 2-day ticket for Hiroden streetcars, Miyajima Matsudai Kisen ferries to Miyajima, and ropeways for Mt. Misen
 1-day ticket for Hiroden streetcars and ferries
 1-day ticket for Hiroden streetcars
 1-day passport for "no car day" on the 22nd of every month
 Paseo card - Prepaid card for Hiroden Streetcar, Astram Line and bus services around Hiroshima
 Transfer card: Used when transferring from one line or route to another

See also

List of railway lines in Japan
List of light-rail transit systems

Hiroden Streetcar lines and routes